Anton Mader (7 January 1913 – 19 February 1984) was a German pilot during World War II. He claimed 86 victories and was a recipient of the Knight's Cross of the Iron Cross. He commanded the fighter wing Jagdgeschwader 54 in 1944.

Early life and career
Mader was born on 7 January 1913 in Castelnuovo, at the time in the Kingdom of Dalmatia of Austria-Hungary, present-day Kaštel Novi in Dalmatia, Croatia. He was the son of an Imperial and Royal Kapellmeister, a leader of a musical ensemble, who later served in the Austrian Armed Forces.

In 1933, Mader was conscripted into the Austrian Armed Forces serving with Alpenjägerregiment 10, the 10th Alpine Mountain Regiment. He then attended the military academy at Enns and the Theresian Military Academy at Wiener Neustadt. Promoted to Leutnant (second lieutenant), he was transferred to Fliegerregiment 2, the 2nd Flight Regiment of the Austrian Air Force. Following the Anschluss in March 1938, the forced incorporation of Austria into Nazi Germany, Mader was transferred to the Luftwaffe (the Nazi German Air Force) holding the rank of Oberleutnant (first lieutenant). On 1 April, a newly formed I. Gruppe (1st group) of Jagdgeschwader 138 (JG 138—138th Fighter Wing) stationed in Wien-Aspern also referred to as the "Wiener-Jagdgruppe" ("Vienna fighter group") was created, largely staffed with former Austrian Air Force personnel. There, Mader was made Staffelkapitän (squadron leader) of 3. Staffel (3rd squadron) of JG 138. On 1 May 1939, his unit I. Gruppe of JG 138 was re-designated and became I. Gruppe of Jagdgeschwader 76 (JG 76—76th Fighter Wing). Initially equipped with the Fiat CR.32, 3. Staffel received the Messerschmitt Bf 109 B. The Gruppe was reequipped with the Bf 109 E-1 and E-3 in 1939. That year, command of 3. Staffel transferred to Oberleutnant Franz Eckerle.

World War II
World War II in Europe began on Friday 1 September 1939 when German forces invaded Poland. In preparation of the invasion, I. Gruppe of JG 76 had been moved to an airfield at Stubendorf, present-day Izbicko in Poland, on 17 August 1939 and supported the German advance on the central and southern sectors of the front.

On 24 September 1940, Mader was appointed Staffelkapitän of 1. Staffel of Jagdgeschwader 2 "Richthofen" (JG 2—2nd Fighter Wing). He succeeded Oberleutnant Otto Bertram who was transferred.

The Gruppenkommandeur of II. Gruppe of JG 77, Hauptmann Helmut Henz, was killed in action on 25 May 1941. In consequence, Mader was given command of the Gruppe. Command of 1. Staffel of JG 2 was given to Leutnant Ulrich Adrian. In July 1941, SS-Gruppenführer Reinhard Heydrich briefly served in II. Gruppe under the command of Mader.

Eastern Front
In preparation for Operation Barbarossa, the German invasion of the Soviet Union, was moved to Bucharest and was located in the sector of Heeresgruppe Süd (Army Group South). II. Gruppe arrived in Bucharest on 15 June. Five days later, III. Gruppe moved to Roman. That evening, the pilots and ground crews were briefed of the upcoming invasion of the Soviet Union, which opened the Eastern Front.

Wing commander
On 1 April 1943, Mader was tasked with the formation of the newly created Jagdgeschwader 11 (JG 11—11th Fighter Wing) and became its first Geschwaderkommodore (wing commander). Command of II. Gruppe of JG 77 was given to Hauptmann Siegfried Freytag who had already severed as acting commander since 7 March.

On 28 January 1944, Mader succeeded Oberstleutnant Hubertus von Bonin, who had been killed in action on 15 December 1943, as Geschwaderkommodore of JG 54. In the fall Mader fell ill and had to transfer command of JG 54 to Oberst Dietrich Hrabak on 1 October. After hospitalization, Mader attended staff training at the Luftkriegsschule Berlin-Gatow, the air war school in Gatow. Mader was then posted to the staff of the General der Jagdflieger (General of Fighters), an office held by Oberst Gordon Gollob. In late April 1945, Mader, along with Gollob's staff, was taken prisoner of war by US forces in Austria.

Later life and service
Mader was released from captivity in June 1945. He then worked as a courier for the Embassy of the United States in Vienna. In 1955, the Austrian State Treaty re-established Austria as a sovereign state. Mader joined the Austrian Air Force, referred to as the Österreichische Luftstreitkräfte, holding the rank of Oberstleutnant. He served with the Fliegerführungskommando (Air Command) and was promoted to Oberst in the general staff in 1961 and to Brigadier in 1966.

Summary of career

Aerial victory claims
According to US historian David T. Zabecki, Mader was credited with 86 aerial victories. Mathews and Foreman, authors of Luftwaffe Aces — Biographies and Victory Claims, researched the German Federal Archives and found records for 78 aerial victory claims. This figure includes 73 aerial victories on the Eastern Front and five over the Western Allies, including three four-engined heavy bombers.

Victory claims were logged to a map-reference (PQ = Planquadrat), for example "PQ 72263". These sectors were then subdivided into 36 smaller units to give a location area 3 × 4 km in size.

Awards
 Iron Cross (1939) 2nd and 1st class
 Honour Goblet of the Luftwaffe on 15 September 1941 as Hauptmann and Gruppenkommandeur
 German Cross in Gold on 2 January 1942 as Hauptmann in the II./Jagdgeschwader 77
 Knight's Cross of the Iron Cross on 23 July 1942 as Major and Gruppenkommandeur of the II./Jagdgeschwader 77
 Decoration of Honour for Services to the Republic of Austria
 Decoration of Honour in Gold (1964)
 Grand Decoration of Honour (1970)

Notes

References

Citations

Bibliography

 
 
 
 
 
 
 
 
 
 
 
 
 
 
 
 
 
 
 
 
 
 

1913 births
1984 deaths
People from Kaštela
Luftwaffe pilots
German World War II flying aces
Recipients of the Gold German Cross
Recipients of the Knight's Cross of the Iron Cross
Austrian generals
Theresian Military Academy alumni
World War II prisoners of war held by the United States
Recipients of the Grand Decoration for Services to the Republic of Austria